Anel Patricia Nava Pérez (born 4 February 1977) is a Mexican politician from the Labor Party. From 2009 to 2011 she served as Deputy of the LXI Legislature of the Mexican Congress representing Durango.

References

1977 births
Living people
Politicians from Durango
Women members of the Chamber of Deputies (Mexico)
Labor Party (Mexico) politicians
21st-century Mexican politicians
21st-century Mexican women politicians
Deputies of the LXI Legislature of Mexico
Members of the Chamber of Deputies (Mexico) for Durango